The 225th Brigade Support Battalion is a United States Army unit based at Schofield Barracks, Hawaii. It is part of the 2nd Infantry Brigade Combat Team, 25th Infantry Division.

Unit History
The 225th CSB was originally activated on 10 February 1971 in Vietnam to provide direct support to the 2nd Brigade, 25th Infantry Division. After only a few months in Vietnam, the 2nd Brigade returned to Hawaii and the 225th Combat Support Battalion was deactivated and the unit was not yet authorized distinctive unit colors or motto.

Almost a generation later Charlie Company, 25th Medical Battalion; Bravo Company, 725th Main Support Battalion; and the 2nd Forward Support Coordinator Staff, HHC, DISCOM were task-organized into the 225th Forward Support Battalion (Provisional). The units trained and deployed with the 2nd (Warrior) Brigade for JRTC 91-5 in Fort Chaffee, Arkansas before activation in the DISCOM, 25th Infantry Division (Light) along with other newly reorganized battalions.

Since activation on 17 May 1991, the 225th Brigade Support Battalion has continued to serve with distinction. Major deployments include: numerous deployments to Pohakuloa Training Area on Hawaii island; Operation Garden Sweep on Kauai to recover from Hurricane Iniki; Team Spirit '93, South Korea; JRTC rotations 94, 96-7, and 98-09, Fort Polk, Louisiana; Operation Uphold Democracy in Port-au-Prince, Haiti; Operation Marathon Pacific, Wake Island to return Chinese Migrants in the Pacific; Cobra Gold 1997, 1999, 2002, and 2003 in Thailand, SFOR 11 in Bosnia in 2002, and Operation Iraq Freedom-II in Kirkuk, Iraq. Upon returning from Iraq, the 225th Forward Support Battalion, then commanded by LTC Donnie Walker, became the 225th Brigade Support Battalion.

The battalion colors for the 225th Brigade Support Battalion were officially authorized by the United States Institute of Heraldry on 1 October 1991. Buff and Scarlet, colors traditionally associated with support organizations, are the primary colors of the flag. Embroidered on the flag is the unit coat of arms and crest. The coat of arms is a buff shield with two black keys addorsed and intertwisted over gold and scarlet-handled crossed sabers. The crest for the battalion is red oriental demidragon gule holding service in Vietnam and his spear symbolizes combat. The colors of the crest are red for courage and sacrifice and gold for excellence. Embroidered on the scroll of the colors is the battalion's motto, "Warrior Support".

The battalion has now transitioned to the new modular structure employed by the US Army and is assigned as the support unit for the 2nd Infantry Brigade Combat Team, 25th Infantry Division. It presently consists of a HHC, A Co (Distribution), B Co (Maintenance) and C Co (Medical).

External links
 225th Brigade Support Battalion Website

References 

Military units and formations in Hawaii
BSB 0225